In nuclear physics and atomic physics, weak charge refers to the Standard Model weak interaction coupling of a particle to the Z boson. For example, for any given nuclear isotope, the total weak charge is approximately −0.99 per neutron, and +0.07 per proton. It also shows an effect of parity violation during electron scattering.

This same term is sometimes also used to refer to other, distinct quantities, such as weak isospin, weak hypercharge, or the vector coupling of a fermion to the Z boson (i.e. the coupling strength of weak neutral currents).

Theoretical basis

The formula for the weak charge is derived from the Standard Model, and is given by

where  is the weak charge,  is the weak isospin,

Extension to larger, composite protons and neutrons 
This relation only directly applies to quarks and leptons (fundamental particles), since weak isospin is not clearly defined for composite particles, such as protons and neutrons, partly due to weak isospin not being conserved. Equivalently, one can sum up the weak charges of the constituent quarks to get the same result.

Thus the calculated weak charge for the neutron is

The weak charge for the proton calculated using the above formula and a weak mixing angle of 29° is

a very small value,  similar to the nearly zero weak charge of charged leptons (see the table below).

Corrections arise when doing the full theoretical calculation for nucleons, however. Specifically, when evaluating Feynman diagrams beyond the tree level (i.e. diagrams containing loops), the weak mixing angle becomes dependent on the momentum scale due to the running of coupling constants, and due to the fact that nucleons are composite particles.

Relation to weak hypercharge  
Because weak hypercharge  is given by

the weak hypercharge   , weak charge   , and electric charge  are related by

where  is the weak hypercharge for left-handed fermions and right-handed antifermions, or

in the typical case, when the weak mixing angle is approximately 30°.

Derivation 
The Standard Model coupling of fermions to the Z boson and photon is given by:

where
 is the B boson field,  is the W boson field, and
 is the elementary charge expressed as rationalized Planck units,

and the expansion uses for its basis vectors the (mostly implicit) Pauli matrices from the Weyl equation:

and

The fields for B and W boson are related to the Z boson field  and electromagnetic field  (photons) by

and

The  term that is present for both left- and right-handed fermions represents the familiar electromagnetic interaction. The terms involving the Z boson depend on the chirality of the fermion, thus there are two different coupling strengths:

and

It is however more convenient to treat fermions as a single particle instead of treating left- and right-handed fermions separately. The Weyl basis is chosen for this derivation:

 

Thus the above expression can be written fairly compactly as:

where

Particle values 

 

The table omits antiparticles. Every particle listed (except for the uncharged bosons the photon, Z boson, gluon, and Higgs boson which are their own antiparticles) has an antiparticle with identical mass and opposite charge. All signs in the table have to be reversed for antiparticles.

All left-handed (regular) fermions and right-handed antifermions have  and therefore interact with the W boson. They could be referred to as "proper"-handed. Right-handed fermions and left-handed antifermions, on the other hand, have zero weak isospin and therefore do not interact with the W boson (except for electrical interaction); they could therefore be referred to as "wrong"-handed ("wrong" for W). "Proper"-handed fermions are organized into isospin doublets, while "wrong"-handed fermions are represented as isospin singlets. While "wrong"-handed particles do not interact with the W boson (no charged current interactions), all known "wrong"-handed fermions do interact with the Z boson (neutral current interactions).

"Wrong"-handed neutrinos (sterile neutrinos) have never been observed, but may still exist since they would be invisible to existing detectors. Sterile neutrinos play a role in speculations about the way neutrinos have masses (see Seesaw mechanism).

Massive fermions always exist in a superposition of left-handed and right-handed states, and never in pure chiral states. This mixing is caused by interaction with the Higgs field, which acts as an infinite source and sink of weak isospin and / or hypercharge, due to its non-zero vacuum expectation value (for further information see Higgs mechanism).

Empirical formulas
Measurements in 2017 give the weak charge of the proton as  .

The weak charge may be summed in atomic nuclei, so that the predicted weak charge for Cs (55 protons, 78 neutrons) is 55×(+0.0719) + 78×(−0.989)  −73.19, while the value determined experimentally, from measurements of parity violating electron scattering, was −72.58 .

The formula was found consistent to 0.1% accuracy using the Yb, Yb, Yb, and Yb isotopes of ytterbium.

In the ytterbium test, atoms were excited by laser light in the presence of electric and magnetic fields, and the resulting parity violation was observed. The specific transition observed was the forbidden transition from 6s S to 5d6s D (24489 cm). The latter state was mixed, due to weak interaction, with 6s6p P (25068 cm) to a degree proportional to the nuclear weak charge.

See also 
 Weak hypercharge
 Weak isospin
 Z boson
 Weak interaction
 Neutral current

Notes

References 
 

Nuclear physics